Bradley James McDonald (born 17 February 1990) is a Papua New Guinean international footballer who last played as a defensive midfielder for Central Coast United in the NSW NPL 3.

Born in Mount Hagen, McDonald played youth football in Australia after moving there at a young age. He played for a number of Australian clubs at senior level, including in the A-League for North Queensland Fury and Central Coast Mariners.

Career
After moving to Australia at the age of 5, McDonald began his career with the Brisbane Roar in their youth system before heading to the Brisbane Strikers in the QSL competition.

On 12 August 2010, McDonald was signed by the North Queensland Fury. McDonald made his debut for the club against Adelaide United coming off the bench. He has been a regular started since his debut.

On 15 April 2011, he signed for A-League outfit Central Coast Mariners. He made only one first team league appearance for the side, starting in a 2–1 win over Melbourne Heart on 30 March 2013. He also appeared in one AFC Champions League match, coming on as a late substitute in a loss to Guizhou Renhe in April 2013.

In January 2016, McDonald returned to the Mariners, having spent three seasons playing in the National Premier Leagues. He was released by the club one year later.

International

McDonald was called up by Aurelio Vidmar for an Australia U-23 training camp in October 2011. At the time, he stated that he was still potentially interested in playing for Papua New Guinea as an alternative to Australia.

In September 2014, McDonald made his debut for Papua New Guinea, coming on as a substitute and setting up a goal in a 2–1 loss to Singapore. In January 2016, he stated his commitment to representing Papua New Guinea and that he was in the process of obtaining citizenship which is necessary to appear in competitive matches for the country. He hoped to have the paperwork completed in time to compete in the 2016 OFC Nations Cup. However, he was not part of the final roster for the tournament.

Honours

Club
Central Coast Mariners:
 A-League Premiership: 2011–2012
 A-League Championship: 2012–2013

References

External links

1990 births
Living people
Papua New Guinean footballers
Papua New Guinea international footballers
Papua New Guinean expatriate footballers
Expatriate soccer players in Australia
A-League Men players
National Premier Leagues players
Brisbane Strikers FC players
Northern Fury FC players
Central Coast Mariners FC players
Central Coast Mariners Academy players
APIA Leichhardt FC players
Manly United FC players
Davao Aguilas F.C. players
Expatriate footballers in the Philippines
Association football midfielders